

Winter transfer window

Out of window transfer

Footnotes

References
general
 
 
specific

Italy
Trans
2006-07